Give Me the Night may refer to:

 Give Me the Night (album), by George Benson, 1980
 "Give Me the Night" (George Benson song), 1980
 "Give Me the Night", a song by BWO from Fabricator
 "Give Me the Night", a song by DragonForce from The Power Within